Havran (Slovak and Czech feminine: Havranová) is a surname. It means "rook" in Czech and Slovak. Notable people with the surname include:

 Monika Havranová (born 1997), Slovak football player
 Wendy Havran (1955–2020), American immunologist

See also

References

Czech-language surnames
Slovak-language surnames
Surnames from nicknames